The Vencer Sarthe is a Dutch sports car produced by Vencer. It is the first automobile to be produced by Vencer.

History 
A prototype of the Sarthe was unveiled in 2013 by Prince Albert II of Monaco at the Top Marques auto show in Monaco. In September 2013, it was awarded the 'Most Sensational Supercar 2013' award. The first Vencer Sarthe was sold at a Vencer dealership in China.

Performance 
The Sarthe is powered by supercharged 6.3 liter V8 engine. The car has a top speed of 338 km/h (210 mph), and can accelerate from 0 to 100 km/h (62 mph) in 3.6 seconds.

Design 
The Sarthe was inspired by 1980s 24 Hours of Le Mans racecars. It has an 'automatic' rear spoiler and carbon fiber bodywork that is manufactured at the Vencer factory in the Netherlands. All the panels on the inside of the car are made with carbon fiber.

Awards 
 Most Sensational Supercar 2013

Media appearances 
Asphalt 8: Airborne
Asphalt 9: Legends

References

External links 
 Vencer Sarthe official site

2010s cars
Cars of the Netherlands
Rear mid-engine, rear-wheel-drive vehicles